The ProA Player of the Year Award is a most valuable player award that is handed out to the best player of a given ProA season. The ProA is the second highest basketball division of Germany.

Winners

References

Basketball most valuable player awards
European basketball awards
ProA